Friedrich Emil Fritz Prym (28 September 1841, Düren – 15 December 1915, Bonn) was a German mathematician who introduced Prym varieties and Prym differentials.

Prym completed his Ph.D. at the University of Berlin in 1863 with a thesis written under the direction of Ernst Kummer and Martin Ohm.  In 1867 he started a Professor at the University of Würzburg, where he later became Dean, and then Rector in 1897–98.

References

External links

Picture of Prym
Friedrich Prym

19th-century German mathematicians
1841 births
1915 deaths
Humboldt University of Berlin alumni
Algebraic geometers
Academic staff of the University of Würzburg
Complex analysts
20th-century German mathematicians